Interhotel Cherno More is a 4-stars hotel and at 72.2 meters the highest building in Bulgarian port city Varna.

It is also the 25th highest building in Bulgaria.

The hotel is located near the Sea Garden, the largest landscaped park in the Balkans.

See also 
List of tallest buildings in Bulgaria

References

External links 
Homepage
Location on Google Maps.

Skyscrapers in Bulgaria
Hotels in Varna, Bulgaria
Hotel buildings completed in 1978
1978 establishments in Bulgaria